Adriaan Valckenier (6 June 1695 – 20 June 1751) was Governor-General of the Dutch East Indies from 1737 to 1741. Mainly remembered for his involvement in the 1740 Batavia massacre, Valckenier later died in a prison in Batavia (present-day Jakarta).

Biography
Valckenier's father, an alderman and secretary in Amsterdam, was an official of the Dutch East India Company based in Amsterdam. Valckenier's paternal grandfather was Gillis Valckenier, one of the great regents of Amsterdam during the later Dutch Golden Age. On 22 October 1714, Adriaan left on board the 'Linschoten' to be assistant buyer (onderkoopman) in the Dutch East Indies, where he arrived on 21 June 1715 at Batavia.

In 1726, he became merchant and chief buyer (opperkoopman); in 1727 he was "Accountant General" (boekhouder-generaal) of the Dutch Indies; in 1730, he was appointed to the Council of the Indies (Raad extra-ordinair), and, in 1733, as a full "Councillor". In 1736, he was made "First Councillor" and "Director-General", but was beaten to the post of Governor General by Abraham Patras. When Patras died (3 May 1737), Valckenier was named Governor General by the Council of the Indies on 3 May 1737.

The Chinese Massacre of 1740

It was during the rule of Adriaan Valckenier that the notorious slaughter of Chinese took place in Batavia (the so-called Chinese Massacre). A previous Governor-General (Henricus Zwaardecroon) had encouraged many Chinese to come to Batavia. The population was approaching 50% of Chinese provenance. They worked in the construction of the houses and fortifications of Batavia and on the sugar plantations outside the city. Many Chinese merchants also took a leading, if (from the Dutch point of view) illegal, role in the trade with China. From 1725 the sugar trade began to collapse, partly because of competition from Brazil and coffee was added.

Unemployment in the countryside grew, and along with that, unrest. This spread to Batavia as unemployed Chinese left the countryside to seek work or food relief there. The authorities were alarmed at this and began issuing residence permits, and requiring those with permits to live in specific areas. Unrest grew to a full-scale insurrection in the countryside in September 1740, when the Dutch had suggested transporting unemployed Chinese to other Dutch colonies in Ceylon and South Africa. A rumour spread that they would all be thrown overboard en route, and in some accounts, they died when rioting on the ships, and riots in the countryside exploded.

The Dutch authorities were afraid that the Chinese within Batavia were collaborating with the insurrection and, during 9–10 October, brutal searches were made of Chinese areas, in which many thousands were killed, often after having been arrested. This "massacre" lasted three days, followed by many more days of looting and arson, with no obvious government attempt to stop the violence. One estimate is that between 5,000 and 10,000 Chinese (men, women and children) were killed in total.

Dismissal and death
Gustaaf Willem, Baron van Imhoff, a colleague and rival of Valckenier, objected to this violence. Van Imhoff was subsequently arrested and sent back to the Netherlands, where, unfortunately for Valckenier, Imhoff's views were well received by the Directors. Valckenier had also been accused of mishandling the coffee trade—fearing overproduction, he had destroyed over half of the plantations. This resulted in a great loss when he could not supply renewed demand, for which the Directors blamed him and had fined him 168,000 florins. He did not manage his Council very well, and there were many intrigues and brawls among members. Van Imhoff's influence in Amsterdam resulted in Valckenier being dismissed as Governor-General (1741) and recalled to the Netherlands. His functions were transferred to Johannes Thedens. Valckenier had been initially cleared by the Directors of wrongdoing, (and given the rank of admiral) but he was re-arrested on his way home, in Cape Town (25 January 1742), and returned to the castle prison in Batavia to await trial. He arrived on 12 August 1742. A long, slow, investigative process was then begun, which had not been concluded, nearly ten years later, when Valckenier died, still in prison, on 20 June 1751. He was buried without ceremony. Van Imhoff, his greatest antagonist, had been appointed his successor.

References

Bibliography
 Johan Leonard Blussé (1981) Batavia 1619–1740. The Rise and Fall of a Chinese Colonial Town, University Press
 Paulus, J., Graaff, S. d., Stibbe, D. G., Spat, C., Stroomberg, J., & Sandbergen, F. J. W. H. (1917). Encyclopaedie van Nederlandsch-Indië. 's-Gravenhage: M. Nijhoff
 Putten, L.P. van, 2002 Ambitie en onvermogen : gouverneurs-generaal van Nederlands-Indië 1610–1796
 Stapel, F.W. (1941) Gouverneurs-Generaal van Nederlandsch-Indië
 De Chineezen te Batavia en de troebelen van 1740 / door Johannes Theodorus Vermeulen (1938)

External links
  http://www.vocsite.nl/geschiedenis/personalia/valckenier.html

1695 births
1751 deaths
Dutch accountants
Dutch people who died in prison custody
Governors-General of the Dutch East Indies
Dutch East India Company people from Amsterdam